The Ambassador of Australia to the Holy See is an officer of the Australian Department of Foreign Affairs and Trade and the head of the Embassy of the Commonwealth of Australia to the Holy See. The first nominee for this position was Dudley McCarthy, appointed in 1973, who was also the ambassador to Spain, but the Vatican refused to accept the nomination on the grounds that McCarthy had been divorced. The appointment was subsequently attached to the office of the Ambassador to the Netherlands, Denmark, Turkey, Ireland, Malta, Sweden and Switzerland. In 2008 Tim Fischer was appointed as the first permanent resident ambassador to the Holy See. In 1986, Sir Peter Lawler had been appointed resident ambassador for four months prior to Pope John Paul II's visit to Australia.

The current ambassadors, since August 2020, is Chiara Porro.

List of heads of mission

Notes
: Lawler was resident ambassador in the Vatican City for four months prior to Pope John Paul II's visit to Australia.
: In April 1991 it was announced that Burke had resigned from his post with effect from July 1991 in order to face a royal commission and was eventually jailed. Burke was asked to hand back his appointment as an Officer of the Order of Australia.

References

 
Holy See
Australia